Hans Friedrich Hermann Isay (26 June 1920 – 5 October 2015), popularly known by his stage name Sean Graham, was a German-born Ghanaian filmmaker and former military leader of British Army. In cinema, he is best known for directing the critics acclaimed Ghana films The Boy Kumasenu, Jaguar and Two Weeks in September.

Personal life
Graham was born on 26 June 1920 in Berlin, Germany. During the World War I, he fled with his family to Britain in 1933 and educated at Peterhouse, Cambridge. During his life at Britain, he studied law at Cambridge university. When the World War II started, his life was at threat, where he quickly changed his name to Sean Graham. Then he worked as an interpreter with British army intelligence, and gradually became lieutenant-colonel.

He died on 5 October 2015 in London at the age of 95.

Career
After the war ended, Graham became a film trainee along with Paul Rotha at Elstree studios. In 1948, he moved to Ghana and contributed to uplift the Ghanaian film industry during a span of ten years. In 1952, he directed his film debut with The Boy Kumasenu, which was nominated for the BAFTA Best Film. Then he moved to Tunisia for a brief period and returned to work in film in London.  In 1957, he directed and produced a documentary Freedom for Ghana which received critics acclaim. Then in 1967, his film Two Weeks in September was screened in many film festivals worldwide. He lived and worked in Turkey making films for some years before finally returning to London.

In 2015, Government of Ghana conferred a State honor on Graham due to his pioneering work on Ghanaian cinema.

He was also the author of three novels: A Surfeit of Sun (Weidenfeld & Nicolson, 1964) and Hippo's Coup (Weidenfeld & Nicolson, 1968), both set in Africa; and The French Odalisque based on the life of Aimée du Buc de Rivéry (Orbach & Chambers, 2009).

Filmography

References

External links
 

1920 births
2015 deaths
Ghanaian film directors
20th-century German people
Ghanaian film producers
People from Berlin
German expatriates in the United Kingdom
Immigrants to Ghana